Wong Tung & Partners is an international architecture, planning and design firm established in Hong Kong in 1963.  It has offices in Hong Kong, Beijing, Shanghai, Shenzhen and Chongqing.

Wong Tung & Partners provides multi-disciplinary services in architecture, interiors, planning and urban design.  The firm has over 250 architectural professionals and personnel in Hong Kong and more than 150 staff in Mainland China. Their projects include Urban Design and Planning,  Large Scale Mixed Use Developments, Super Highrises,  Large Scale Residential Developments, Hotels, Healthcare, Retail Centres, Hi-Tech Headquarter, throughout Southeast Asia, Middle East, North America and the People's Republic of China.

The Firm also founded Zhong Tian Wong Tung International Engineering Design Consultants Co., Ltd., a joint-venture Grade A Design Institute in China.

In 2013, the firm ranked 54 on the WA100 (World Architecture 100) list of largest architectural practices in the world.

Recent Projects 

 Kai Tak Cruise Terminal, Hong Kong, 2013 (in association with Foster + Partners)
 Tencent Headquarters, Shenzhen, China, 2011 (Competition entry)
 Sino Portuguese Trade Center, Macau SAR, China, 2017 (Competition Entry)
 Changsha IFS Tower T1, Changsha, China
 Chongqing IFS, Chongqing, China
 Trade & Industry Tower, Kai Tak, Hong Kong
Victoria Skye, Kai Tak, Hong Kong

Major Projects 
 MegaBox, Hong Kong
 MGM Macau, Macau, 2010
 Dragon Centre, Sham Shui Po, Hong Kong, China
 The China World Trade Center, Beijing, China
 One Central Macau, Macau
 St. Francis Towers
 Hillsborough Court, Hong Kong
 Hong Kong Parkview, Hong Kong
 K. City, Kai Tak, Hong Kong
 Mei Foo Sun Chuen, Kowloon, Hong Kong
 Taikoo Shing, Hong Kong
 Fleur Pavilia, Hong Kong

References

External links

 Wong Tung & Partners(official website)
 Wong Tung & Partners on Architizer
 Wong Tung & Partners on Archello

Architecture firms of Hong Kong